New York's 64th State Assembly district is one of the 150 districts in the New York State Assembly. It has been represented by Republican Michael Tannousis since 2021, succeeding Nicole Malliotakis.

Geography
The district consists of a portion of Bay Ridge in Brooklyn and the eastern shore of Staten Island.

Recent election results

2022

2020

2018

2016

2014

2012

References

64